The 1824 United States presidential election in Ohio took place between October 26 and December 2, 1824, as part of the 1824 United States presidential election. Voters chose 16 representatives, or electors to the Electoral College, who voted for President and Vice President.

During this election, the Democratic-Republican Party was the only major national party, and four different candidates from this party sought the Presidency. Ohio voted for Henry Clay over Andrew Jackson, John Quincy Adams, and William H. Crawford. Clay won Ohio by a narrow margin of 1.53%. This was the first time that Ohio voted for a losing presidential candidate.

Results

See also
 United States presidential elections in Ohio

References

Ohio
1824
1824 Ohio elections